Geoffrey Thomas Hartlieb (born December 9, 1993) is an American professional baseball pitcher in the Miami Marlins organization. He has played in Major League Baseball (MLB) for the Pittsburgh Pirates and New York Mets.

Amateur career
Hartlieb attended Highland High School in Highland, Illinois. Hartlieb was all-state in basketball his junior and senior years of high school, and originally quit baseball at the end high school. He attended Quincy University in Quincy, Illinois his freshman year of college in 2013 and played college basketball for the Hawks. He then transferred to Lindenwood University in Saint Charles, Missouri to play college baseball from 2014 through 2016. He was drafted by the New York Mets in the 37th round of the 2015 MLB draft, but did not sign and returned to Lindenwood. He was then drafted by the Pittsburgh Pirates in the 29th round of the 2016 Major League Baseball draft and signed.

Professional career

Pittsburgh Pirates
Hartlieb spent his first professional season with the Bristol Pirates in 2016, going 4–1 with a 4.44 earned run average (ERA) in 26 innings pitched. He spent the 2017 season with the West Virginia Power and the Bradenton Marauders, combining to go 2–6 with a 2.12 ERA in  innings. In 2018, he played for the Altoona Curve, going 8–2 with a 3.24 ERA in 58 innings. During the 2018 offseason, he played for the Surprise Saguaros of the Arizona Fall League.

Hartlieb opened the 2019 season with the Triple-A Indianapolis Indians.

Hartlieb had his contract selected and he was promoted to the major leagues for the first time on May 17, 2019. He made his major-league debut on May 18 versus the San Diego Padres.

In 2020 for Pittsburgh, Hartlieb pitched to a 3.63 ERA, allowing only one home run in  innings pitched. In 2021, Hartlieb split the between Indianapolis and Pittsburgh, but struggled to a 7.71 ERA in four major-league appearances before he was designated for assignment on July 3, 2021.

New York Mets
On July 9, 2021, Hartlieb was claimed off waivers by the New York Mets and was assigned to the Triple-A Syracuse Mets. Hartlieb made seven appearances for the Mets in 2021, struggling to an 11.00 ERA with nine strikeouts. On September 2, Hartlieb was designated for assignment by the Mets.

Boston Red Sox
On September 4, 2021, Hartlieb was claimed off of waivers by the Boston Red Sox, and was optioned to the Triple-A Worcester Red Sox. On September 23, Hartlieb was designated for assignment by the Red Sox. He cleared waivers and was sent outright to Worcester on September 26. He elected free agency on November 10, 2022.

Miami Marlins
On November 29, 2022, Hartlieb signed a minor league deal with the Miami Marlins.

References

External links

1993 births
Living people
Baseball players from Illinois
People from Highland, Illinois
Major League Baseball pitchers
Pittsburgh Pirates players
New York Mets players
Bristol Pirates players
West Virginia Power players
Bradenton Marauders players
Altoona Curve players
Indianapolis Indians players
Surprise Saguaros players
Lindenwood Lions baseball players
Quincy Hawks men's basketball players
Syracuse Mets players
Worcester Red Sox players